The Hotel Breakers, opened in 1905, is a large historic Lake Erie resort hotel located at 1 Cedar Point Drive in the Cedar Point amusement park in Sandusky, Ohio.

History

George A. Boeckling, then general manager of Cedar Point, believed that the longer guests stayed at Cedar Point, the more profitable the resort would be. The park's two hotels at that time, the 20-room Bay Shore Hotel and the 125-room White House Hotel, were having trouble meeting the demands of overnight visitors. So, Boeckling made plans to build a massive hotel on the resort's beach. Keeping with Boeckling's vision of Cedar Point as the "Queen of American Watering Places", he set out to build the resort's grandest hotel. The Hotel Breakers opened on June 12, 1905, featuring 600 rooms, most with a view of Lake Erie. Each room included running water and one hundred had private baths, a rarity for hotels at that time. The hotel's Breakers Cafe seated 400 guests. The hotel was designed by the Knox & Elliott architectural firm and was influenced by chateaus Boeckling had seen while traveling in France.

The hotel's lobby featured round seats, which remain a Cedar Point tradition. The ceiling was elaborate pressed tin and included chandeliers crafted by Tiffany artists. The hotel's original amenities included imported wicker furniture, large brass beds, a manicurist, a medical doctor, a tailor, a stenographer, a barbershop, news stand, ice cream parlor and souvenir counter. Adjacent to the lobby was a four-story rotunda featuring four tiers of balconies, which remains in the hotel. Singers from the Metropolitan Opera gave impromptu performances in the rotunda from their balconies during the 1910s and 1920s.

A new wing was added to the Breakers in 1917 bringing the number of rooms to more than 700. The 160-room Bon Air wing of the hotel was added to the north side in 1926, bringing the number of rooms to 875. In 1935, the Hotel Breakers was modernized and the Tavern Terrace added near the hotel. The outdoor stage area provided entertainment and served cocktails.

In 1995, the hotel added Breakers East, featuring 206 rooms, including 103 regular rooms, 95 suites and eight tower suites. The  Breakers East project also featured three conference/meeting rooms and an outdoor pool and spa. Breakers East sits on a five-acre site just east of the Hotel Breakers’ lobby. The 10-story Breakers Tower wing was added to the Hotel Breakers in 1999 with a five-story connecting link that is located just west of the Hotel Breakers’ historic lobby and rotunda. Breakers Tower has a total of 230 rooms and suites, including 17 luxury suites with private balconies.

It was designated a U.S. National Historic Landmark in 1987 but was altered significantly in 1999 with the demolition of several historic wings. After the demolition the hotel's National Historic Landmark status was removed on August 7, 2001.

Cedar Point announced a two-year renovation of the hotel would begin in 2013. The renovations include repainting the hotel, replacing its roof, and a remodel of the interior in the off-season after summer 2014. The renovations are the largest cost project ever at Cedar Point.

In 2018, the Bon Air wing of the hotel was replaced with a new 6 story tower (Breakers West) designed in the same style as the original resort, but with modern amenities and connecting rooms for families, as well as its own outdoor pool and jacuzzi.

Notable people
Over the years notable guests have included:

Features
The hotel sits on the one mile beach mentioned on Cedar Point's web page. There are 511 rooms and suites with a small portion with a Peanuts comic theme. The hotel has two outdoor pools and one indoor pool, each with a hot tub nearby. The hotel contains a conference center, shops including Tommy Bahama, and several restaurants including T.G.I. Friday's and Perkins Restaurant.

The 2014-2015 remodel replaced the dinner restaurant with a Japanese teppanyaki and sushi restaurant, a new lobby bar, an in house Starbucks, a dedicated Dominos pizza delivery kitchen, as well as a new beach bar.

Gallery

References

External links

 Hotel Breakers page
 Hotel Breakers Photo Gallery

Breakers
National Historic Landmarks in Ohio
Breakers
Hotel buildings completed in 1905
Former National Historic Landmarks of the United States
Buildings and structures in Sandusky, Ohio
1905 establishments in Ohio
National Register of Historic Places in Erie County, Ohio
Former National Register of Historic Places in Ohio